D'Hautpoul was a  74-gun French Navy ship of the line launched at Lorient on 2 September 1807. She was previously named Alcide and Courageux.

French service
On 16 February 1809 Captain Amand Leduc, Chevalier of the Légion d'honneur, commanded D'Hautpoul on her maiden voyage, a mission to Martinique with reinforcements and supplies, as the flagship of a squadron of three 74-gun ships. Learning of the capture of Martinique, Troude's squadron turned back but was pursued by the British.

Recruit hung on the tail of the French squadron and managed to cripple D'Hautpouls mizzen mast, so Pompée could bring her to action and capture her after exchanging fire for 75 minutes. Between 80 and 90 men from D'Hautpoul were killed or wounded, including several officers.

British service
Taken as a prize, she was renamed Abercrombie, and was briefly given to the commander of Recruit, Charles Napier, who was made post captain for his part in the action, as acting captain. Captain William Fahie of Pompée, who had fallen ill after capturing her, then replaced Napier.

Abercrombie participated in the capture of Guadeloupe in January and February 1810. In 1847 the Admiralty awarded the Naval General Service Medal with clasp "Guadaloupe" to all surviving participants of the campaign.

In February 1810 Captain Fahie was appointed a commodore to assist with landings. The squadron arrived off St Martin's on 14 February, and the combined might of the ships and a company of the 25th Regiment of Foot forced the French and Dutch occupants to surrender by 16 February. On 21 February Abercrombie sailed to Saint Eustatius with Ringdove; the island also quickly capitulated.

After being repaired at Plymouth at the cost of £16,375, Abercrombie sailed for Portugal on 30 December 1810 as part of Admiral George Berkeley's squadron off Lisbon. On 5 September 1811 she took the French brigs Les Deux Amis and Le Jean Baptiste, and the sloop La Marie French while in company with Pompée, HMS Dryad, and HMS Arrow. While she was at anchor in the Basque Roads on 26 October 1811, lightning damaged her fore topmast and foremast.

Between 1812 and 1813 Abercrombie served in the English Channel. On 14 January 1813 Abercrombie, still under the command of Captain Fahie, recaptured the British trader Industry. On 17 July 1813 she shared the proceeds of the capture of Union with HMS Dublin, and on 17 December captured Marie Antoinette.

Fate
By May 1814 Abercrombie was lying decommissioned in the Hamoaze. She was sold for £3,810 at Plymouth on 30 April 1817.

See also
 List of ships of the line of France

Notes, citations, and references
Notes

Citations

References

 Clowes, William Laird (1898) The Royal Navy: A History from the Earliest Times to 1900 Volume Five. Sampson Low, Marston and Company.

External links 
 

1807 ships
Conflicts in 1813
Ships of the line of the French Navy
History of the Royal Navy
Ships built in France
Ships of the line of the Royal Navy
Téméraire-class ships of the line
Captured ships